Zanthoxylum xichouenseis a woody climber from the Rutaceae family.

Description
Zanthoxylum xichouense are woody climbers that have been found in Southeast Yunnan.

Classification
The species was published in Acta Phytotax in 1975.  It would later be accepted in 2008's Flora of China.

References

xichouense